This article lists a chronology of Stanley Cup engravings.
A unique feature of the Stanley Cup is that, with few exceptions in the past, it is the only trophy in professional sports that has the name of the winning players, coaches, management, and club staff engraved on it, but this has not always been the case as some teams did not engrave their names on the Cup for unknown reasons (which was rectified with a redesign of the Cup in 1948). When he first donated the Cup in 1892, one of Lord Stanley of Preston's original conditions was that each team could, at their own expense, add a ring on the Cup to commemorate their Cup victory (the first year being an exception). Lord Stanley's original trophy was simply a silver bowl minted with the words "Dominion Hockey Challenge Cup" on one side of the outside rim, and "From Stanley of Preston" with his family's coat of arms on the other side. The format and location of the engravings, including the addition and deletion of extra bands and rings attached to the bottom of Lord Stanley's original cup/bowl, has changed through the years. By its 125th anniversary in 2017, the Stanley Cup had had 3,177 names engraved on it, of which 1,331 belong to players.

Challenge Cup Era

During the Challenge Cup Era from 1893–1914, the Stanley Cup was a "challenge trophy"; the champions held onto the Cup until they either lost their league title to another club, or a champion from another league issued a formal challenge and subsequently defeated the reigning Cup champion in a special game or series.

Teams had to add their names to the trophy at their own expense.  Initially, there was only one ring, the one added by the first Cup champion Montreal HC. Clubs then engraved their team names, usually in the form "[TEAM NAME] [YEAR WON]", on that one ring until it was full in 1902. With no room to engrave their names (perhaps unwilling to pay for a second band to the Cup), teams started leaving their mark on the bowl itself. A second ring was finally added by the Ottawa Senators in 1909. As mentioned earlier in this article, some teams during this era did not engrave their names on the Cup.

(*) Note: The Winnipeg Victorias engraved "1895" instead of "1896" because they won their Stanley Cup Challenge against Montreal prior to the end of the 1896 season.

The "World Series" Era
Before the 1914–15 season, a new agreement was reached in which the respective champions of the NHA and the Pacific Coast Hockey Association would face each other for the Cup, similar to baseball's World Series played between the American League and National League champions.

This agreement effectively ended the Challenge Cup rule in which a new champion was crowned after it won the title of the previous champion's league. However, the 1915 Ottawa Senators, the 1916 Portland Rosebuds, and the 1918 Vancouver Millionaires all engraved their names on the Cup even though they did not officially win it under the new system.

The NHA dissolved in 1917, and the National Hockey League (NHL) took its place. Then after the Western Canada Hockey League (WCHL) was born in 1921, it was agreed that all three league champions would play for the Cup. The PCHA and the WCHL later merged to form the Western Hockey League (WHL) in 1924.† - Engraved their name on the Cup despite only winning the league title of the previous champion..

 The NHL takes over the Cup, and the "Stovepipe" 

The WHL folded before the 1926-27 season began.  As a result, the Cup has since been awarded to the annual NHL champions.

Once the Cup became, effectively, the NHL championship trophy, the engraving of the Cup winner's information became a consistent annual tradition.  This means that no Cup winning team has been missed since the 1922-23 Ottawa Senators chose to leave their name off the Cup.

Originally, a new band was added almost every year, causing the Cup to grow in size.  Thus, it became commonly referred to as the "Stovepipe Cup" because of its resemblance to the exhaust pipe of a stove.  It was also occasionally called the "cigar" Cup or the "elephant's leg" Cup for similar reasons.

The 1948 redesign

With the Stovepipe Cup becoming impractical because of its ever-increasing height, the NHL decided to redesign the trophy.

The base of the Stovepipe Cup (all of the bands before the New York Rangers' 1928 ring) was moved back to the top directly under the bowl. A new shoulder collar was added below, onto which only the names of the previous winning teams were engraved.  This new shoulder includes all winning team names only.  The 1908, 1910 Montreal Wanderers,  1911 Ottawa Senators, 1918 Toronto Arenas, 1922 Toronto St. Pats, 1920, 1921, 1923 Ottawa Senators team names were finally added to the Cup. The cancelled 1919 Stanley Cup Finals was also acknowledged with "1919/Montreal Canadiens/Seattle Metropolitans/Series Not Completed". Room was left on the new collar for future teams.

All of the 1927–28 to 1945–46 rings from the Stovepipe Cup were redone into nine bands of various heights that were attached below the new collar, forming a vastly expanded barrel-like body. The first 5 rings and half the sixth ring included the winners 1928, 1930 to 1939. There was room to add one more team the sixth band. The 1956 winner was added later. Underneath that was a replica of the wide 1940 band from the Stovepipe Cup, but expanded to allow room for all winners from 1940 to 1951. The 1946–47 Cup champion Toronto Maple Leafs, who had to wait a year because of the redesign, was also added to the wide band. Finally, two more narrow blank bands were added to the bottom of the trophy for the winners 1952 to 1955.

The 1957 redesign
As soon as the 1956 Montreal Canadiens added their names to the Cup, all of the various narrow and wide bands of the trophy's barrel was full. Therefore, they were replaced with five symmetrical bands, each of which could contain 13 winning teams. The winning teams and rosters from 1927–28 to 1939–40 were engraved on the first band, the 1940–41 to 1952–53 champions on the second band, and the 1953–54 winners onward on the third band.

Although the bands were originally designed to fill up during the Cup's centennial year, the names of the 1964–65 Montreal Canadiens were engraved over a larger area than allotted (and thus there are 12 teams on that band instead of 13). Also the Cup underwent several minor alterations, namely the retirement of the collar in 1963 and the bowl in 1969 in favor of duplicates because the originals became too brittle.Unless otherwise noted, all of the following teams also engraved their full rosters on the stated location, and put their club name on the shoulder collar.''

The top ring is retired
After the bands were finally all filled, the top band of the large barrel, with the 1927–28 to 1939–40 champions, was taken to the Hockey Hall of Fame, and a new blank band was introduced at the bottom so the size of the Stanley Cup would not grow further.

One year later, the shoulder collar listing the names of the previous winners was also filled to capacity, but it was decided to keep it on the trophy, unchanged in perpetuity.  1991-92 Pittsburgh Penguins was last winning team to be engraved on the collar.

A second ring is retired

The band listing the 1940–41 to 1952–53 Cup winners was scheduled to be retired following the crowning of the 2004–05 champions. However, that season was cancelled because of a labour dispute. The ring was finally taken to the Hockey Hall of Fame one year later after the 2005–06 champion Carolina Hurricanes were crowned. In addition to listing the names of the Hurricanes on the new bottom ring, it was decided to also acknowledge the cancelled 2004–05 season.

A third ring is retired

The band listing the 1953–54 to 1964–65 Cup winners was retired on October 1, 2018, following the crowning of the 2017–18 champions, the Washington Capitals.

References 

 
 
 
 
 
 

Engravings